Sea Gull Lake is a lake in Cook County, Minnesota, in the United States.

Sea Gull Lake is an English translation of the Ojibwe-language name; it was so named for the abundance of seagulls.

See also
List of lakes in Minnesota

References

Lakes of Minnesota
Lakes of Cook County, Minnesota